Royal Air Force Carnaby or more simply RAF Carnaby is a former Royal Air Force emergency landing strip that offered crippled bombers a safe place to land near the English coast during the Second World War.

History

RAF Carnaby opened in March 1944 under the control of No. 4 Group Royal Air Force. Two similar airfields were either constructed or further developed along the east coast of England, at Manston and Woodbridge, all three providing an emergency option for wartime bomber crews. The three airfields were developed to the same pattern, Woodbridge being the first to open in November 1943. The runway at Manston was brought into operation in April 1944.

These airfields were intended for use by returning bombers suffering from low-fuel and/or suspected damage to their pneumatic (wheel brake) and/or hydraulic (undercarriage) systems. At each of the three airfields, the runway was divided into three  lanes. The northern and central lanes were allocated by flying control, while the southern lane was the emergency lane on which any aircraft could land without first making contact with the airfield. Over 1,400 bombers made an emergency landing at Carnaby by the end of the war.

Air Chief Marshal Basil Embry in Mission Completed believed that the three emergency runways were constructed as a result of the success of the -long landing strip and flarepath at RAF Wittering in accepting over 70 damaged aircraft from Bomber Command. The runway had been lengthened in 1940 to reduce landing accidents to Bristol Beaufighter night fighters returning at night and in bad weather.

Fog Investigation and Dispersal Operation

Carnaby was one of fifteen airfields operating the fog dispersal system known as Fog Investigation and Dispersal Operation (FIDO). The system consisted of two rows of pipes emitting burning petrol one on each side of the runway, the heat from this fire raised the air temperature above the runways, cutting a hole in the fog and provided crews with a brightly lit strip indicating the position of the runway.

Post Second World War
The station closed in 1946 but was re-activated in 1953 due to the need to train pilots for the Korean War. The airfield was used as a Relief Landing Ground for No. 203 Squadron (then based at RAF Driffield) but closure to flying came soon after in 1954.

RAF Carnaby was a PGM-17 Thor missile base from 1959 to 1963 controlled by No. 150 Squadron RAF.

Post-RAF history
 RAF Carnaby was for many years used for the storage of new Lada cars and a parts distribution centre.  The runway and other paved areas were also used to hold motorcycle racing events throughout the 1970s and 1980s, some of which were televised.  Today it has been developed into Carnaby Industrial Estate.

References

Citations

Bibliography

External links

wikimapia reference

Royal Air Force stations of World War II in the United Kingdom
Royal Air Force stations in Yorkshire
Buildings and structures in the East Riding of Yorkshire